TOMSO (2-methoxy-4-methyl-5-methylsulfinylamphetamine) is a lesser-known psychedelic drug and a substituted amphetamine. TOMSO was first synthesized by Alexander Shulgin. In his book PiHKAL, the dosage range is listed as 100–150 mg, and the duration listed as 10–16 hours. TOMSO is inactive on its own; it is activated with the consumption of alcohol. It produces intense time distortion and a threshold. Very little data exists about the pharmacological properties, metabolism, and toxicity of TOMSO.

See also 
 TOM (psychedelic)

References

Substituted amphetamines
Phenol ethers
Sulfoxides
Methoxy compounds